The 2020 Colombian Women's Football League (officially known as the Liga Femenina BetPlay Dimayor 2020 for sponsorship purposes) was the fourth season of Colombia's top-flight women's football league. The season started on 16 October and ended on 13 December 2020.

Santa Fe won their second title in the competition after beating defending champions América de Cali in the finals by an aggregate score of 4–1 over two legs.

Format
For this season the league featured 13 teams, down from the 18 which had originally expressed their intention to take part prior to the COVID-19 pandemic. The 13 teams were split into two groups of four teams and one group of five teams, where they played each other in a double round-robin tournament. The top two teams in each group as well as the two best third-placed teams advanced to the quarter-finals, with the winners advancing to the semi-finals. The winners of each semi-final qualified for the finals to decide the champions. All rounds in the knockout stage were played on a home-and-away, double-legged basis. The champions and runners-up qualified for the 2020 Copa Libertadores Femenina.

Teams 
13 teams took part in the competition. The teams are affiliated with DIMAYOR affiliate clubs. Atlético, Atlético Huila, Cortuluá, Cúcuta Deportivo, Deportes Tolima, Deportivo Pereira, Once Caldas, and Orsomarso did not field a team in this edition, whilst Llaneros competed for the first time.

Stadia and locations

First stage
The First stage started on 16 October and consisted of two groups of four teams and one group of five. It ended on 20 November with the top two teams from each group as well as the two best third-placed teams advancing to the knockout stage.

Group A

Group B

Group C

Ranking of third-placed teams
The two best teams among those ranked third qualified for the knockout stage.

Knockout stage

Bracket

Quarter-finals

|}

Semi-finals

|}

Finals

Santa Fe won 4–1 on aggregate.

Top goalscorers

Source: Fémina Fútbol

See also
 Colombian Women's Football League

References

External links 
 Dimayor's official website 

2020 in South American football leagues
2020 in Colombian football
2020